This is a list of singles that have peaked in the Top 10 of the Billboard Hot 100 during 1977.

Fleetwood Mac scored four top ten hits during the year with "Go Your Own Way", "Dreams", "Don't Stop", and "You Make Loving Fun", the most among all other artists.

Top-ten singles

1976 peaks

1978 peaks

See also
 1977 in music
 List of Hot 100 number-one singles of 1977 (U.S.)
 Billboard Year-End Hot 100 singles of 1977

References

General sources

Joel Whitburn Presents the Billboard Hot 100 Charts: The Seventies
Additional information obtained can be verified within Billboard's online archive services and print editions of the magazine.

1977
United States Hot 100 Top 10